Everette Edward Carpenter, Jr. (born March 3, 1981) is an American auto racing driver, currently competing in the IndyCar Series for his team, Ed Carpenter Racing. He is the stepson of Indy Racing League founder Tony George.

Career history
Carpenter was born in Paris, Illinois, and grew up in the town of Marshall until the age of 8. He then moved to Indianapolis. He is a graduate of Butler University.

Early career
Carpenter has had a successful career in midget racing dating back to 1989. Carpenter would win national quarter-midget events in Xenia, Ohio and Hagerstown, Maryland in 1996.

United States Automobile Club

USAC Regional Series
Carpenter drove in the USAC Regional Series in 1998 in the midget division. Carpenter drove the No. 3 TG Racing car at 16th Street Speedway. At the track event on June 27, 1998 Carpenter qualified with the 11th fastest time. Carpenter won the third heat race and finished the feature in 3rd place.

USAC National Midget Car Series
Carpenter drove in the USAC National Midget Series in 1999 for TG Racing in the No. 3 Ed Pink Beast in fifteen races. Carpenter won a race at Louisville Motor Speedway and finished 13th in points. Carpenter returned in 2000 to drive the No. 3 TG Motorsports car. Carpenter achieved four top five finishes with a best finish of 2nd at the Belleville Nationals at the Belleville High Banks and finished 9th in the final point standings. In 2001, Carpenter drove the No. 2 Steele car at South Boston Speedway, where he started 11th and finished 8th. In 2002 Carpenter returned to the series to drive for Klatt Enterprises. Carpenter competed in three races and finished 44th in points.

USAC Silver Crown Series
Carpenter competed in the United States Auto Club#USAC Silver Crown Series in 2000. Carpenter originally competed for former Indy car driver George Snider in car No. 111 at the season-opening Copper World Classic at Phoenix International Raceway; Carpenter finished in 9th place to claim the Rookie of the Race award. Carpenter started driving for George Snider's relative Debbie Snider in the No. 7 Chevrolet-powered Beast, with George Snider and Jimmy Sills acting as mentors to him and giving him advice about tracks. Carpenter had a best finish of 6th in the Southern Illinoisan 100 at the DuQuoin State Fairgrounds Racetrack. Carpenter started on the pole position in the A. J. Foyt's True Value Hulman Hoosier Hundred at the Indiana State Fairgrounds Speedway, the series' most prestigious race. Carpenter led the first 80 laps before crashing and finishing in 20th place. Carpenter also won the Rookie of the Race award at Nazareth Speedway with a 7th-place finish. Carpenter finished 12th in the final point standings. In 2001 Carpenter returned to drive for George Snider in the No. 11 – numbered 111 at Gateway International Raceway – car. Carpenter's best finish was sixth at the Coca-Cola 100 at Indianapolis Raceway Park, and he finished ninth in the final point standings.

In 2002 Carpenter drove the No. 44 Sinden Racing car. At the season-opening Little Trees 100 at Phoenix, Carpenter started 2nd and finished 21st after suffering an engine failure after 85 laps. Carpenter also drove for Hoffman Auto Racing in the No. 69 Dynamics car at the Golden Hoosier Hundred at the Indiana State Fairgrounds Speedway – starting 17th and finishing 24th due to a crash after 59 laps – and the No. 67 Zarounian car at the Ted Horn 100 at the DuQuoin State Fairgrounds Racetrack; Carpenter started from pole position and finished 25th due to an accident after 58 laps. Carpenter's best finish of the season was at the Dominic's of New York 100 at Richmond International Raceway where he started 7th and finished 2nd, leading for 12 laps. Carpenter finished the season ranked 22nd in the final point standings. For 2003 Carpenter again drove for Hoffman Auto Racing in the No. 69 Dynamics car. Carpenter's best finish of 3rd place came at the Dominic's of New York 100 at Richmond after starting 10th. Carpenter finished 35th in the final point standings.

USAC Sprint Car Series
In 2001 Carpenter began competing in the USAC Sprint Car Series in the No. 1111 TG Racing car. At the season-ending USAC Sprint Legends Classic at Salem Speedway, Carpenter had the 3rd fastest qualifying time, finished 6th in the first heat and won the "Semi" race. In the feature race Carpenter took the lead with 10 laps to go and won. Carpenter finished 12th in the final point standings. In 2002 Carpenter drove for Sinden Racing, where he took one win during the season, and finished 19th in the final point standings.

North American Auto Racing Series
In 2000 Carpenter competed in the North American Auto Racing Series-sanctioned NAMARS National Midget Championship series in the No. 3C TG Racing car. Carpenter attempted to qualify for the Chili Bowl at Tulsa Expo Center, considered to be the "biggest Midget race of the year". Carpenter failed to qualify for the qualifier and missed the feature race as a result.

IndyCar

Indy Lights Series
Carpenter joined the then-new Indy Racing League sanctioned Infiniti Pro Series in 2002, driving the No. 2 Sinden Racing car. At the season-opening Kansas 100 at Kansas Speedway, Carpenter started and finished 5th. Carpenter's best finish of 2nd came in the Kentucky 100 at Kentucky Speedway, and he also achieved a pair of 3rd-place finishes in the Michigan 100 at Michigan International Speedway and the Gateway 100 at Gateway International Speedway. Carpenter finished out the season ranked 3rd, with 226 points. In 2003 Carpenter moved to A. J. Foyt Enterprises to drive the No. 14 car. Carpenter won his only Indy Lights race at the series' most prestigious race, the Futaba Freedom 100 at the Indianapolis Motor Speedway. Carpenter qualified on the pole position at the Aventis Racing for Kids 100 at Kansas Speedway and the Chicagoland 100 at Chicagoland Speedway, finishing 2nd in each race. Carpenter again finished the season ranked 3rd, with 377 points. In 2005 Carpenter returned to the series for Vision Racing to drive the No. 9 car on a one-off basis; he competed at the Liberty Challenge on the road course at Indianapolis. Carpenter qualified 13th out of 14 cars and finished 11th, the last car on the lead lap; the result saw him finish 26th in the drivers' championship, with 19 points.

IndyCar Series
Carpenter's first experience in the IndyCar Series came in 2001 at Atlanta Motor Speedway when he tested a car for Panther Racing.

2003–2005
In 2003, Carpenter began competing in the IndyCar Series for PDM Racing in the No. 18 Dallara-Chevrolet. Carpenter made his debut at the Delphi Indy 300 at Chicagoland Speedway; he started in 16th place and finished in 13th place. Carpenter then competed at the Toyota Indy 400 at California Speedway, starting in 17th place and finishing in 13th place, two laps down. At the season-ending Chevy 500 at Texas Motor Speedway, Carpenter started in 22nd place and finished in 21st place due to alternator problems after completing 69 laps. Carpenter finished the season ranked in 26th place, with 43 points. In 2004, Carpenter ran his first full-time season for Red Bull Cheever Racing in the No. 52 Dallara-Chevrolet. At the season-opening Toyota Indy 300 at Homestead-Miami Speedway, Carpenter started in 9th place and finished in 12th place. During the season, Carpenter struggled to match the results of teammate Alex Barron. Carpenter's best finish was 8th place at the Belterra Casino Indy 300 at Kentucky Speedway. Carpenter qualified for the Indianapolis 500, starting in 16th place and finishing in 31st place due to a crash after 62 laps. Carpenter finished the season in 16th place, with 245 points. For 2005, Carpenter's stepfather Tony George started a new team called Vision Racing after purchasing the equipment from Kelley Racing. Carpenter drove for the team in the No. 20 Dallara-Toyota. During the year, Carpenter and the team struggled; his best start was 16th place at the SunTrust Indy Challenge at Richmond International Raceway. Carpenter's best finish was at the Firestone Indy 200 at Nashville Superspeedway with a 10th-place finish, one lap down. Carpenter qualified for the Indianapolis 500, starting in 26th place and finishing in 11th place, one lap down. Carpenter finished the season in 18th place, with 244 points.

2006
Carpenter returned with Vision Racing in 2006 in the No. 20 Dallara-Honda. On March 26, 2006, during the warmup practice session for the season-opening Toyota Indy 300 at Homestead, Carpenter was involved in a crash with Paul Dana, who died soon after from his injuries. Carpenter was reported to be "awake and alert," airlifted to Jackson Memorial Hospital and was released the next day suffering bruised lungs. Carpenter returned to the series for the third race of the season, the Indy Japan 300 at Twin Ring Motegi, starting in 19th place and finishing in 20th place due to a crash after 25 laps. At the Indianapolis 500, Carpenter and his teammates acquired sponsorship from Rock and Republic for the race. Carpenter started in 12th place and ran in the top 10 late in the race; he finished 11th, a lap down, after a late-race pit stop. At the following race, the Watkins Glen Indy Grand Prix at Watkins Glen International, Carpenter started in 18th place and finished in 6th place after his team decided to put on rain tires for the wet conditions. At the Firestone Indy 400 at Michigan International Speedway, Carpenter started in 4th place and finished in 7th place. At the season-ending Peak Antifreeze Indy 300 at Chicagoland, Carpenter started in 12th place and finished in 5th place. Carpenter finished the season ranked in 14th place, with 252 points.

2007
In 2007, Carpenter again competed with Vision Racing to drive the No. 20 Dallara-Honda. Carpenter started off the season with a 6th-place finish at the season-opening XM Satellite Radio Indy 300 at Homestead. The team acquired sponsorship from Hitachi Power Tools for the Indianapolis 500 onwards. At Indianapolis, Carpenter started in 14th place and finished in 17th place after being involved in a crash with Marco Andretti, Dan Wheldon and others which resulted in Andretti flipping down the back straightaway. Just after the crash, the race was stopped due to rain. Carpenter's best finish in the remaining races was at the Iowa Corn Indy 250 at Iowa Speedway with a 6th-place finish after starting 5th. Carpenter finished the season ranked in 15th place, with 309 points.

2008

For 2008, Carpenter returned with Vision Racing to drive the No. 20 Dallara-Honda. At the season-opening Gainsco Auto Insurance Indy 300 at Homestead, Carpenter qualified in 2nd place, but his time was nullified as his car – as well as the car of teammate A. J. Foyt IV – failed technical inspection. Despite starting at the rear, Carpenter worked his way through the order to finish in 6th place. Carpenter added another 6th-place finish at the Indy Japan 300 at Twin Ring Motegi. At the Indianapolis 500, Carpenter qualified in 10th place and finished in 5th place, leading 3 laps. After eight races, Carpenter ranked eighth in points, however, Carpenter only achieved top-ten finishes in the Firestone Indy 200 at Nashville and the Meijer Indy 300 at Kentucky. Carpenter finished out the year with a fiery crash in the Peak Antifreeze Indy 300 at Chicagoland while running in the top five. Carpenter finished the season ranked in 15th place, with 320 points.

2009

In 2009, Carpenter returned with Vision Racing in the No. 20 Dallara-Honda and started with poor performances in the first two races – both street circuits – at the Honda Grand Prix of St. Petersburg and the Toyota Grand Prix of Long Beach. Carpenter then achieved back-to-back top 10 finishes on the ovals at the RoadRunner Turbo Indy 300 at Kansas Speedway with a 9th-place finish, and at the Indianapolis 500, Carpenter qualified in 17th place and finished in 8th place. The day after the ABC Supply Company A. J. Foyt 225 at the Milwaukee Mile – where Carpenter finished in 16th place, 6 laps down – Carpenter's wife Heather gave birth to their second child, Ryder. Carpenter got his best finish of the season at the Meijer Indy 300 at Kentucky, leading 34 laps before finishing 0.0162 seconds behind Ryan Briscoe following a pitched side-by-side battle. Carpenter finished out the season ranked in 12th place, with 321 points.

2010
In 2010, Vision Racing lost its sponsors and as a result, shut down as a full-time team. Therefore, Carpenter drove for Panther Racing in conjunction with Vision Racing in the No. 20 Dallara-Honda at the Indianapolis 500. In the race, Carpenter started in 8th place and finished in 17th place due to a caution occurring during a round of pit stops, which put Carpenter a lap down. The two teams later fielded the car in the Peak Antifreeze & Motor Oil Indy 300 at Chicagoland, the Kentucky Indy 300 at Kentucky, and the season-ending Cafés do Brasil Indy 300 at Homestead. At Chicagoland, Carpenter started in 11th place and quickly challenged for the lead, leading for 3 laps. Carpenter then had handling issues and retired with around 20 laps to go; he was scored in 20th place. At Kentucky, Carpenter qualified on pole and led a front-row sweep with teammate Dan Wheldon. Carpenter led for 11 laps and almost achieved his first victory when cars ahead of him had to make pit stops late in the race; he ultimately finished in 2nd place as Hélio Castroneves managed to conserve fuel to the end of the race without making another pit stop. At the season-ending race at Homestead, Carpenter started in 7th place and finished in 13th place, one lap down. Carpenter finished in 28th place in the drivers' championship with 90 points.

2011
For 2011, Carpenter moved to Sarah Fisher Racing, driving the No. 67 Dallara-Honda. The team competed in a partial season consisting of all the oval races and select road course and street circuit races. Carpenter made his season début at the Indianapolis 500, where he qualified in 8th place and finished in 11th place after leading for 3 laps. In the Firestone Twin 275s at Texas Motor Speedway, Carpenter started the opening race in 5th place and finished in 18th place. For the second race, Carpenter drew a 10th place starting position – via a random draw – and finished in 16th place. Following the two Texas races, Carpenter and the team began to struggle in qualifying and Carpenter had a best start of 14th place at the Iowa Corn Indy 250 at Iowa. Carpenter further struggled on the non-oval races, which resulted in his best finishes being a trio of 11th-place finishes at Indianapolis, Iowa and the MoveThatBlock.com Indy 225 at New Hampshire Motor Speedway. At the penultimate race of the season, the Kentucky Indy 300 at Kentucky, Carpenter started in 4th place and led for 8 laps. In the late stages of the race, Carpenter battled with Chip Ganassi Racing's Dario Franchitti, who was in a championship battle with Will Power. Carpenter beat Franchitti by 0.0098 seconds – the series' closest finish at the track – to record his first series victory.

At the season-ending IZOD IndyCar World Championship at Las Vegas Motor Speedway, Carpenter started in 3rd place and was soon running in 2nd place to pole sitter Tony Kanaan after 11 laps, when a major accident occurred in turn 1. Dan Wheldon was fatally injured during the crash. The race was canceled afterward, and with the results expunged, Carpenter finished the season ranked in 26th place, with 175 points. In the separate sub-classification for the oval races, Carpenter ranked 6th with 141 points.

2012

In 2012, Carpenter started his team, Ed Carpenter Racing, driving the No. 20 Dallara-Chevrolet. During the season, Carpenter struggled in qualifying and, in the first 14 races of the season, had a best start of 19th in the Firestone 550 at Texas. Carpenter further struggled on non-oval races, resulting in a best finish of 12th place at the Chevrolet Detroit Belle Isle Grand Prix at Belle Isle. On the ovals Carpenter was more competitive; at the Indianapolis 500 Carpenter crashed during Pole Day qualifying and re-qualified on Bump Day. Carpenter started in 28th place and moved into the top five in the late stages of the race only to spin on lap 180, which took Carpenter out of contention; he finished in 21st place, one lap down. At Texas, Carpenter started in 19th place and quickly moved up through the field, only to finish in 12th place after dropping back late in the race. At the Milwaukee IndyFest at the Milwaukee Mile, Carpenter started in 22nd place and finished in 8th place, his first top ten of the season. Carpenter had another 8th-place finish at the Iowa Corn Indy 250 at Iowa after starting in 21st place. Carpenter then started in 8th place at the Grand Prix of Baltimore but he crashed on lap 7 of the race and was scored in 25th place. For the season-ending MAVTV 500 IndyCar World Championships at Auto Club Speedway, Carpenter started in 5th place and quickly challenged for the lead, which he held for 62 laps. Going into the last lap, Carpenter attempted to pass leader Dario Franchitti just as Takuma Sato lost control in turn 4. Carpenter completed the pass before the caution came out, and as a result, achieved his second IndyCar win. Carpenter finished the season ranked in 18th place, with 261 points. Carpenter finished in 7th place in the sub-classification for oval races, with 133 points.

2013

Carpenter returned with ECR in 2013 to drive the No. 20 Dallara-Chevrolet. Carpenter improved his qualifying results on the ovals, with a worst start of 14th at the Pocono IndyCar 400 at Pocono Raceway. Despite this, Carpenter struggled away from the ovals, achieving a best start of 14th at the Itaipava São Paulo Indy 300, and a best finish of 13th in the opening race of the double-header in Toronto. On the ovals, Carpenter's results were significantly better, including pole position at the Indianapolis 500, where Carpenter's single-car team beat out all three cars fielded by Team Penske and all five cars fielded by Andretti Autosport, two of the largest teams in the series. In the race, Carpenter led for a race-high 37 laps, only to suffer handling issues in the second half of the race and dropped to a 10th-place finish. In the Firestone 550 at Texas, Carpenter qualified 9th and finished 4th. Carpenter's only disappointing oval race was the Milwaukee IndyFest at Milwaukee where Carpenter qualified 20th and finished 14th, two laps down. At the Iowa Corn Indy 250 at Iowa, Carpenter started and finished 4th after leading for 18 laps, being one of the few drivers to pose a threat to race winner James Hinchcliffe. Carpenter then finished 9th at Pocono, where the Chevrolet engines lacked the fuel economy of the rival Honda engines. Carpenter's next competitive race was at the season-ending MAVTV 500 IndyCar World Championships at Auto Club Speedway, where Carpenter started 7th and finished 2nd after leading for a single lap. Carpenter finished the season ranked 16th, with 333 points.

2014
In 2014, Carpenter decided to split driving the No. 20 with Mike Conway; Conway drove the road courses and street circuits while Carpenter drove the ovals. At Carpenter's season debut, the Indianapolis 500, Carpenter qualified on pole position for the second consecutive year. In the race, Carpenter, Ryan Hunter-Reay, Hélio Castroneves and Marco Andretti dominated the lead with Carpenter leading for 26 laps. On lap 176 on a restart for separate crashes between Scott Dixon and Josef Newgarden, Carpenter was running 2nd to Hunter-Reay when Townsend Bell went three-wide in an attempt to pass Carpenter on the outside while James Hinchcliffe was on the inside of Carpenter. Hinchcliffe made contact with Carpenter, sending both of them into the wall. This ended Carpenter's race with a 27th-place finish. At Carpenter's next race, the Firestone 600 at Texas, he qualified 5th and soon battled with Will Power for the lead. Later, when Carpenter and Power were making pit stops, Power came into the pit lane too fast and had to serve a penalty. On lap 142 a caution came out for Takuma Sato who had an engine fire. Carpenter and 2nd place driver Juan Pablo Montoya stayed out while the remaining lead lap cars – Power, Simon Pagenaud, Dixon and Tony Kanaan – pitted to get new tires. On the restart, with three laps to go, Carpenter held off Power for his third career IndyCar Series win.

In the Pocono IndyCar 500 at Pocono, Carpenter started in 13th place and finished in the same position after having to make an extra pit stop to replace a tire. At the following race, the Iowa Corn Indy 300 at Iowa, Carpenter started in 10th place. During the race, Carpenter battled a loose car in the late stages of the race while running in the top 5. On lap 282 Carpenter made contact with Juan Pablo Montoya in turn 3, causing Montoya to crash out of the race. During an interview with the NBC Sports Network, Montoya called Carpenter a "douchebag". During the caution period, Carpenter, Hunter-Reay, Newgarden, and Graham Rahal all made pit stops for new tires. On the restart, Hunter-Reay and Newgarden passed Kanaan, who had dominated the race up to that point, while Carpenter was able to finish up in the fifth position. During the weekend of the ABC Supply Wisconsin 250 at Milwaukee, it was announced that Ed Carpenter Racing was to merge with Sarah Fisher Hartman Racing for the 2015 season, to form CFH Racing. In the race, Carpenter started in 7th place and finished in 9th place. At the season-ending MAVTV 500 IndyCar World Championships at Auto Club Speedway, Carpenter nearly crashed on both of his laps in qualifying and therefore started in 14th place. During the race, Carpenter's pit speed limiter did not function properly, which resulted in a drive-through penalty for speeding on the pit lane. Carpenter recovered to finish in 3rd place behind Chip Ganassi Racing teammates, Kanaan and Dixon. Carpenter finished 22nd in the final drivers' championship standings, with 262 points.

2015

For 2015, Carpenter again shared the No. 20 Dallara-Chevrolet entry; he contested the oval races, and Luca Filippi contested the non-oval races. Carpenter first competed at the Indianapolis 500. On the morning of Pole Day qualifying, Carpenter half-spun in turn 2, and the left side of the car hit the outside wall. The car flipped over and slid down the back straightaway. Carpenter was unhurt in the incident, but as a result of the incident and similar crashes earlier in the month, the series decided the reduce the boost on cars. During this time, Carpenter's team prepared his backup car. Carpenter qualified 12th for the race, in which he struggled and was running in the top 15 when he attempted to pass Oriol Servià for the position on lap 113. The two drivers made contact and crashed into the turn 1 wall and Carpenter was scored in 30th place. Carpenter then competed at the Firestone 600 at Texas; he started in 15th place and finished in 22nd place due to an engine failure after completing 147 laps. Two laps later, Carpenter's teammate Josef Newgarden also retired due to an engine failure. At the MAVTV 500 at Auto Club Speedway, Carpenter started in 4th place and was involved in a crash on the main straightaway with Newgarden on lap 158 and was scored in 22nd place. He then achieved finishes of tenth at Milwaukee, sixth at Iowa, and seventeenth at Pocono. As a result, he finished 27th in points. As of 2022, Carpenter is still racing the four ovals on the Indycar schedule.

Grand-Am Rolex Sports Car Series
Carpenter competed in the Rolex 24 at Daytona in 2007 for Vision Racing in the No. 00 Porsche-Crawford with Tomas Scheckter, Tony George, A. J. Foyt IV and Stéphan Grégoire in the Daytona Prototype class. The car started 18th and finished 29th overall (17th in class) due to engine problems after 587 laps. Carpenter finished the season ranked 103rd in the final points standings. Carpenter returned to the series in 2008, again for the Rolex 24 at Daytona. He drove the No. 03 Vision Racing Porsche-Crawford with George, Foyt, Vítor Meira and John Andretti in the Daytona Prototype class. The car started 20th and finished 25th overall (12th in class) with 615 laps completed. Carpenter ranked 68th in the final points standings.

Media appearances

Film and television
Carpenter was the subject of an episode of the television series IndyCar 36. The episode highlights Carpenter's weekend at the Iowa Corn Indy 250 at Iowa Speedway. The episode was broadcast before the Honda Indy Toronto at Exhibition Place on July 8, 2012.

Motorsports career results

American open-wheel racing results
(key)

Indy Lights

IndyCar Series

 * Season still in progress
 1 Run on same day.
 2 Race cancelled due to death of Dan Wheldon

Indianapolis 500

References

External links

CBS Sports
ESPN interview
IndyCar Driver Page

1981 births
Hulman-George_family
Living people
Racing drivers from Indianapolis
IndyCar Series drivers
IndyCar Series team owners
Indianapolis 500 drivers
Indy Lights drivers
Butler University alumni
Indianapolis 500 polesitters
Park Tudor School alumni
USAC Silver Crown Series drivers
A. J. Foyt Enterprises drivers
PDM Racing drivers
Cheever Racing drivers
Vision Racing drivers
Panther Racing drivers
Sarah Fisher Racing drivers
Ed Carpenter Racing drivers